Adapa is a Danish company that manufactures machinery which allows fabricators and engineers to bring curvature into their designs, using adaptive mould technology. The company is headquartered in Aalborg, Denmark and has a regional office in Dubai, UAE.

Unlike conventional moulds, the adaptive mould is both reconfigurable and repeatable, which allows it to be used for various applications cutting across industries. The technology uses a CAD/CAM based modelling software to send highly customizable designs to the mould, which then aligns itself accordingly to produce the desired curvature on the casting material. This method can be used to shape a surface panel directly, or it could be used to create casts which can later be used to mould other objects.

History 
Adapa was founded in July 2010

Key Projects 

 Adapa wins a US$60 million deal to supply 80 moulds to Limak Group, the contractors for the new terminal at the Kuwait International Airport.

In the Press 

 Reconfigurable tooling: Revolutionizing composites manufacturing
 Unconventional shelters of concrete are set up in the National Park Mols Mountains until spring
 Strong Order in Aalborg: Business doubles the staff
 Adapa: Adaptive mold for the construction industry
 Large Industrialists Help Concrete Inventors Further

References

External links

Companies based in Aalborg
Danish companies established in 2010
Privately held companies of Denmark